Mirnes Mešić (born 16 March 1978) is a Bosnian-Herzegovinian former professional footballer who played as a striker. He played for Kickers Offenbach, Stuttgarter Kickers, TSG Hoffenheim and SC Freiburg.

References

External links
 

1978 births
Living people
People from Doboj
Bosnia and Herzegovina footballers
Association football forwards
VfB Stuttgart II players
SpVgg Ludwigsburg players
Stuttgarter Kickers players
TSG 1899 Hoffenheim players
SC Freiburg players
Kickers Offenbach players
2. Bundesliga players
3. Liga players
Regionalliga players
Bosnia and Herzegovina expatriate footballers
Bosnia and Herzegovina expatriate sportspeople in Germany
Expatriate footballers in Germany